Sarnonico (Sarnónec in local dialect) is a comune (municipality) in Trentino in the northern Italian region Trentino-Alto Adige/Südtirol, located about  north of Trento.

The municipality of Sarnonico contains the frazione (subdivision) Seio.

Sarnonico borders the following municipalities: Brez, Cavareno, Dambel, Fondo, Malosco, Romeno, Ronzone, Ruffré-Mendola, Eppan and Kaltern.

Demographic evolution

References

External links
 Homepage of the city

Cities and towns in Trentino-Alto Adige/Südtirol
Nonsberg Group